Lukas Nathanael Christian Wank is a German basketball player for Skyliners Frankfurt of the Basketball Bundesliga.

Professional career
Lukas Wank has started his professional career on 2014 with Science City Jena.

On July 5, 2016, he has signed with s.Oliver Würzburg of the Basketball Bundesliga.

On October 8, 2017, he has signed with RheinStars Köln of the ProA.

On May 29, 2018, he has signed with Niners Chemnitz of the ProA.

On June 24, 2019, he has signed with Löwen Braunschweig of the Basketball Bundesliga.

On July 6, 2021, he has signed with Skyliners Frankfurt of the Basketball Bundesliga.

National team career
He is part of the German team in the Men's tournament at the 2020 Summer Olympics.

References

1997 births
Living people
Basketball Löwen Braunschweig players
Basketball players at the 2020 Summer Olympics
German men's basketball players
NINERS Chemnitz players
Olympic basketball players of Germany
S.Oliver Würzburg players
Science City Jena players
Skyliners Frankfurt players
People from Altenberg, Saxony
Sportspeople from Saxony